Thomas Taylor Hall (21 May 1921 – 28 January 2008) was an  Australian rules footballer who played with South Melbourne in the Victorian Football League (VFL).

Notes

External links 

1921 births
2008 deaths
Australian rules footballers from Victoria (Australia)
Sydney Swans players